Simon Gardiner (born 10 February 1990) is a Welsh rugby union prop forward who plays for the Scarlets. Gardiner was released by the Scarlets, and joined Rotherham Titans in 2012. After spells at Cardiff RFC and Llanelli RFC, Gardiner moved to Moseley RFC in 2014. Gardiner returned to the Scarlets ahead of the 2017–18 season.

References

1990 births
Living people
Rugby union players from Haverfordwest
Scarlets players
Welsh rugby union players
Ospreys (rugby union) players
Rotherham Titans players
Rugby union props